De Haven is an unincorporated community in northern Frederick County, Virginia. Originally known as Duck Race, De Haven sprang up as a farming community on Back Creek at its confluence with Babbs Run. De Haven is located on Green Spring Road (VA 671) at Hodges Lane (VA 741).

Historic sites 
Pine Grove School
Pine Grove United Methodist Church

References

Unincorporated communities in Frederick County, Virginia
Unincorporated communities in Virginia